Green Glade Senior Public School is a middle school under the Peel District School Board located in Mississauga, Ontario. The school serves students from grade 6-8 in the Lorne Park area. The school also has an Extended French program which serves grade 7 & 8 students from most of Mississauga.

Enrollment
Green Glade has 275 students as of December 2022. Approximately two-thirds of the school's enrollment is from the Extended French program. For this reason, there are significantly less sixth grade students than there are seventh and eighth graders (The Extended French Program begins in the seventh grade). As the school's Extended French enrollment zone spans the majority of Mississauga, the student body is very culturally and economically diversified despite its location in south-western Mississauga.

After completing grade 8, the Extended French students, accounting for most of the students, typically feed into Lorne Park Secondary School upon graduating whereas English students either attend Lorne Park or its neighbour, Clarkson Secondary School based on area of residence.

Bussing
As of December 2022, 233 of the 275 enrolled students are bussed to school. Twelve buses travel across Mississauga to deliver students safely and in a timely manner. Because the majority of students are reliant on the bus system, when buses are cancelled, the school is left mostly vacant. When less than half the student body is absent due to weather, classes are frequently cancelled and alternative activities take place instead.

References

External links
 

Peel District School Board
Middle schools in Mississauga
Educational institutions in Canada with year of establishment missing